"We Can Work It Out" is a song by the Beatles.

We Can Work It Out may also refer to:

 "We Can Work It Out" (Andreas Johnson song)
 "We Can Work It Out" (Sweetbox song)
 We Can Work It Out: Resolving Conflicts Peacefully and Powerfully. (32 pages)  by Marshall Rosenberg